West Lincoln is a township in the Niagara Region of Ontario, Canada. Main urban areas are located along the former provincial Highway 20. The administrative centre of West Lincoln is the community of Smithville, situated halfway between Hamilton and Pelham.

Communities
The township comprises the communities of Abingdon, Allens Corner, Attercliffe, Basingstoke, Bismark, Boyle, Caistor Centre, Caistorville, Elcho, Fulton, Grassie, Kimbo, Port Davidson, Rosedene, Silverdale, Smithville, St. Anns, Vaughan, Warner, Wellandport, Wilcox Corners and Winslow.

Business
Retail establishments in Smithville are congregated amongst two major nodes:  the downtown core, and the Village Square Mall.

Smithville also has a Farmers Market that runs every Friday afternoon in the summer. The market features a carefully selected variety of vendors showcasing local produce, preserves, meat, honey, flowers and baking.

Demographics 

Municipal government

The Council of West Lincoln is composed of a mayor and six councillors/aldermen who serve for a term of four years. The mayor is elected at large and the councillors are elected by ward. The town is divided into three wards with two councillors elected in each ward.

The mayor is Cheryl Ganann.  Councillors and alderman include:
 Ward 1: Mike Rehner and Jason Trombetta
 Ward 2: Shelly Ann Bradaric and Joanne Chechalk 
 Ward 3: Terry Bell and William Reilly
 Regional Councillor: Albert Witteveen

See also
List of townships in Ontario

References

External links

Township municipalities in Ontario
Lower-tier municipalities in Ontario
Municipalities in the Regional Municipality of Niagara